Hytten is a surname. Notable people with the surname include:

 Mario Hytten (born 1955), Swedish-born former racing driver who raced predominantly under a Swiss license; sports promoter and sponsorship specialist
 Olaf Hytten (1888–1955), Scottish actor